Glacial Lake Nantucket Sound was a glacial lake that formed during the late Pleistocene epoch inside modern Nantucket Sound. After the Laurentide Ice Sheet retreated, glacial ice melt washed over the terminal moraine of Cape Cod and the  glacial meltwater settled in the modern day sound, creating the lake.

See also
Glacial Lake Cape Cod
Lake Connecticut

References

Former lakes of the United States
Lakes of Massachusetts
Glacial lakes of the United States
Proglacial lakes
Late Pleistocene
Pleistocene United States